Witching Hour is the fifth studio album by German gothic metal band The Vision Bleak, released on 27 September 2013 through Prophecy Productions. It is a concept album based on popular fictional witches. A digipak version containing a bonus track, as well as a deluxe edition featuring three bonus tracks, were also released.

A music video for the track "The Wood Hag", entirely animated in stop motion and directed by Fursy Teyssier, was uploaded on Prophecy's official YouTube channel on September 4 to serve as a teaser.

Track listing

Trivia
 "A Witch Is Born" references in its lyrics the Weird Sisters of William Shakespeare's play Macbeth.
 "The Blocksberg Rite" and "Hexenmeister" reference the "Walpurgisnacht" scene in Johann Wolfgang von Goethe's Faust.
 "Cannibal Witch" references the Slavic folktale of the Baba Yaga.
 "The Wood Hag" is a dark retelling of the fairytale "Hansel and Gretel".

Personnel

The Vision Bleak
 Ulf Theodor Schwadorf (Markus Stock) – vocals, guitars, bass, keyboards
 Allen B. Konstanz (Tobias Schönemann) – vocals, drums, keyboards

Guest musicians
 Lana McHall – additional vocals

Miscellaneous staff
 Martin Koller – production

References

External links
 The Vision Bleak's official website

The Vision Bleak albums
2013 albums
Concept albums